Laughing bird may refer to:

 Laughing Bird Caye, an island off the coast of Placencia, Belize

Birds
 Laughing falcon
 Laughing kookaburra
 Laughing owl
 Laughing gull
 Laughing dove